The 2014–15 Women's CEV Cup was the 43rd edition of the European CEV Cup volleyball club tournament, the former "Top Teams Cup".

Participating teams

Main phase

16th Final
1st leg 11–13 November 2014
2nd leg 25–27 November 2014

Notes

8th Final
1st leg 9–11 December 2014
2nd leg 16–18 December 2014

4th Final
1st leg 13–15 January 2015
2nd leg 20–22 January 2015

Challenge phase
1st leg 3–5 March 2015
2nd leg 10–12 March 2015

Final phase

Semifinals
1st leg 24 March 2015
2nd leg 28 March 2015

Final
1st leg 7 April 2015
2nd leg 11 April 2015

Awards

See also
Women's CEV Cup 2013–14

External links

Women's CEV Cup
2014 in women's volleyball
2015 in women's volleyball